Sterry is a surname. Notable people with the surname include:

Arthur W. Sterry (1883–1944), Australian filmmaker, actor and theatrical entrepreneur
Gwen Sterry (1905-?), English tennis player
Jamie Sterry (born 1995), English footballer 
Norman Sterry (1878–1971), American lawyer and footballer
Peter Sterry (1613–1672), English independent theologian
Thomas Sterry Hunt (1826-1892), American geologist and chemist